Perez University College is a co-ed Christian University located in Gomoa Pomadze in the Central region of Ghana. It was formerly known as the Pan African Christian University College. It is the first private university to be established in the Central region. It is affiliated with the University of Cape Coast.

Chancellor
Charles Agyinasare is the Founder of the Perez University College.

Programmes of studies
The university offers many graduate and post graduate degrees including:
Bachelor in Business Administration Accounting
Bachelor in Business Administration Banking and Finance
Bachelor in Business Administration Human Resource Management
Bachelor in Business Administration Marketing
Bachelor in Biblical Studies
Bachelor in Pastoral Care and Counselling

References

Perez University College